DMCS may refer to:

 DEC Multinational Character Set, a character set by Digital Equipment Corporation
 Des Moines Christian School, a Christian centered private school in the Des Moines, Iowa area
 Dumai-Melaka Cable System (cable system) a submarine telecommunications cable system
 Chlorodimethylsilane
 Deluxe Music Construction Set, software by Electronic Arts